Ville Elo (27 June 1895 – 3 February 1947) was a Finnish sports shooter. He competed in the 25 m pistol event at the 1936 Summer Olympics.

References

External links
 

1895 births
1947 deaths
Finnish male sport shooters
Olympic shooters of Finland
Shooters at the 1936 Summer Olympics
Sportspeople from Tampere
19th-century Finnish people
20th-century Finnish people